Gettin' Square is a 2003 crime caper movie set on Australia's Gold Coast and directed by Jonathan Teplitzky. The protagonists are ex-criminals trying to keep out of trouble.

Gettin' Square won nominations at several Australian ceremonies including the AFI Awards, Inside Film Awards, Australian Comedy Awards, and Critics Circle Awards. Wenham's performance as Spitieri saw him win the Best Actor category in every major Australian film award through 2003.

Chris Nyst has also written and directed another feature film, Crooked Business, which was released in 2008.

Cast
 Sam Worthington as Barry 'Wattsy' Wirth, a man recently paroled after serving time for a crime he did not commit.
 David Wenham as Johnny Francis 'Spit' Spitieri, a small-time criminal and friend of Barry's.
 Timothy Spall as Darren 'Dabba' Barrington
 Freya Stafford as Annie Flynn
 Gary Sweet as Chicka Martin
 David Roberts as Niall Toole
 David Field as Arnie DeViers
 Luke Pegler as Joey Wirth
 Richard Carter as Craig 'Crusher' Knobes
 Mitchell Butel as Con Katsakis
 Helen Thomson as Marion Barrington

Plot

Barry Wirth (Sam Worthington) is a retired small-time criminal who is released on parole following the death of his mother, so that he can care for his younger brother, Joey (Luke Pegler). Wirth was falsely convicted for murder by corrupt police detective Arnie DeViers (David Field), who is in the employ of criminal kingpin Chicka Martin (Gary Sweet). Shortly after Wirth is released, a corrupt accountant is arrested and his records seized, causing difficulties for Wirth's new employer, Darren "Dabba" Barrington (Timothy Spall), an ex criminal turned restaurateur whose money is seized along with that of Chicka. Wirth's friend Johnny "Spit" Spitieri (David Wenham), a heroin addict and small-time criminal, is arrested while conducting a drug deal and finds himself owing twenty thousand dollars to Chicka. DeViers continues to harass and threaten Wirth, even as the latter finds success as a chef in Dabba's restaurant. Despite his best efforts to remain clean, Wirth finds himself under increasing pressure to return to his criminal ways in order to help both Dabba and Spit.

Production
Andrew Dominik was approached to direct. He decided not to but strongly recommended the script to Jonathan Teplitzky.

Box office
Gettin' Square grossed $2,292,587 at the box office in Australia.

Home media
Gettin' Square was first released on DVD by Columbia Tristar in 2003. The DVD is compatible with region 4 and includes special features such as deleted scenes, a Popcorn Taxi Q&A, interviews with Jonathan Teplitzky, Chris Nyst, Timothy Spall, David Wenham, and audio commentary with Jonathan Teplitzky and Chris Nyst.It was re-released by Umbrella Entertainment in September 2011.

Awards/nominations

Australian Comedy Awards 2003 

Won Outstanding Comic Performance in a Feature Film - David Wenham

Nominated Outstanding Film Comedy - Squared Productions

Australian Film Institute 2003 
Won Best Actor in a Leading Role - David Wenham

Nominated Best Film - Martin Fabinyi, Timothy White, Trish Lake

Nominated Best Direction - Jonathan Teplitzky

Nominated Best Actor in a Leading Role - Timothy Spall

Nominated Best Actress in a Supporting Role - Helen Thomson

Nominated Best Actor in a Supporting Role - Mitchell Butel

Nominated Best Actor in a Supporting Role - David Field

Nominated Best Production Design - Nicholas McCallum

Nominated Best Cinematography - Garry Phillips

Won Best Original Music Score - Chit Chat von Loopin Stab and 3KShort

Nominated Best Screenplay, Original - Chris Nyst

Nominated Best Editing - Ken Sallows

Nominated Best Sound - John Schiefelbein, Antony Gray, Ian McLoughlin

Nominated Best Costume Design - Jackline Sassine

Film Critics Circle of Australia Awards 2003 
Won Best Actor - Male - David Wenham

Nominated Best Film

Nominated Best Director - Jonathan Teplitzky

Nominated Best Screenplay - Original - Chris Nyst

Nominated Best Cinematography - Garry Phillips

Nominated Best Editing - Ken Sallows

Hawaii International Film Festival 2004 
Won Audience Award Best Narrative Feature - Jonathan Teplitzky

IF Awards 2003 
Won Best Actor - David Wenham

Won Best Script - Chris Nyst

Won Best Editing - Ken Sallows

Won Best Music

Won Best Sound - John Schiefelbein, Antony Gray, Ian McLoughlin

Nominated Best Feature Film
Nominated Best Direction - Jonathan Teplitzky

Nominated Best Cinematography - Garry Phillips

See also
 List of movies set in Australia

References

External links
 Review at SMH.com.au
 
 
 Gettin' Square at the National Film and Sound Archive

2003 films
2000s crime comedy-drama films
2000s heist films
Australian crime comedy-drama films
Australian heist films
Films set in Queensland
Films shot in Brisbane
2003 drama films
Films directed by Jonathan Teplitzky
2000s English-language films